The European Journal of Ecology is an English-language, biannual, scientific journal founded in 2015. It publishes original, peer-reviewed papers (in categories like research articles, reviews, forum articles, policy directions) referring to any branches of ecology. All articles are open access for readers and authors are also free from any publication fees or page charges.

The journal provides a fair publication forum not only for experienced scientists, but also for beginners. Therefore, free language-correction services are provided for authors from non-English speaking regions. Reviewers are required to provide helpful and detailed advice, comments, and constructive criticism.

References

External links 
 EJE´s stories on SOCIAL SHORTHAND
 EJE on Google Scholar
 EJE on the Directory of Open Access Journals

Biannual journals
Ecology journals
De Gruyter academic journals
English-language journals